The 1935 Massachusetts State Aggies football team represented Massachusetts State College in the 1935 college football season. The team was coached by Mel Taube and played its home games at Alumni Field in Amherst, Massachusetts. Massachusetts State finished the season with a record of 5–4.

Schedule

References

Massachusetts State
UMass Minutemen football seasons
Massachusetts State Aggies football